John Douglas Hutton (29 October 1898 – 2 January 1970) was a Scottish footballer who played as a right back for Aberdeen and Blackburn Rovers, and represented the Scotland national team in ten official internationals between 1923 and 1928.

Career
Hutton signed for Aberdeen after the First World War in 1919 and made his debut for the Dons in the same year; originally played at inside forward but switched to full-back. In the 1920s, he was Aberdeen's most-capped player with seven of his ten caps coming while he played for the club.

In October 1926, he joined English club Blackburn Rovers for a then-record £6,000 transfer fee. Hutton won an FA Cup winner's medal in 1928, when Blackburn beat Huddersfield Town 3–1 at Wembley.

Hutton won ten caps for the Scotland national football team and scored one goal, from a penalty kick in a 2–2 draw against Wales in the 1928 British Home Championship. He also represented the Scottish League XI four times.

Hutton managed Belfast club Linfield during the 1940s. During his time in charge, Hutton signed Tommy Dickson for Linfield.

Career statistics

Club

International 

Scores and results list Scotland's goal tally first, score column indicates score after each Hutton goal

Honours
Blackburn Rovers 
FA Cup: 1927–28

See also
List of Scotland national football team captains

References

External links

Scottish footballers
Scotland international footballers
Footballers from Motherwell
Bellshill Athletic F.C. players
Larkhall Thistle F.C. players
Aberdeen F.C. players
Blackburn Rovers F.C. players
1898 births
1970 deaths
Scottish Junior Football Association players
Scottish Football League players
Scottish Football League representative players
English Football League players
Scottish football managers
Linfield F.C. managers
Association football inside forwards
Association football fullbacks
FA Cup Final players